Seegar may refer to:

Edward Seegar (c. 1685 – 1721), Irish-born British pirate and privateer
Miriam Seegar (1907–2011), American silent film actress
Sara Seegar (1914–1990), American stage, film, radio, and television actress, sister of Miriam

See also
Seega, German village
Stacy Seegars (born c. 1972), former American football player

Surnames